Manujan castle is a historical castle located in Kerman Province, The longevity of this fortress dates back to the Sixth century (Solar Hijri).

References 

Castles in Iran